Antonio Perošević (born 6 March 1992) is a Croatian professional footballer who plays as a forward, currently for the Croatian Football League side NK Slaven Belupo.

Club career
Perošević started his career playing at youth level for his hometown club Osijek with whom he had signed a scholarship contract in February 2010. He made his debut for the first team as a late substitute in a 2–0 win against Cibalia on 13 May 2010 in the last round of 2009–10 season. After injuries kept him out of action for a year, he returned for the second part of the 2011–12 season. He scored his first goal in Prva HNL in a 2–1 defeat against Cibalia on 11 March 2012, converting a first-half penalty. He finished the season as Osijek's top league goalscorer with seven goals.

On 30 August 2017, Perošević moved abroad for the first time, signing for Hungarian club Puskás Akadémia. A year later, he moved on to Al-Ittihad Kalba SC in the United Arab Emirates.

On 23 September 2021, Perošević moved to India and signed with Indian Super League side SC East Bengal. He scored 4 goals in 14 matches as his team finished in bottom of the league table.

In January 2023, Perošević returned to Croatia, signing for Slaven Belupo.

International career
Perošević made his senior international debut on 11 January 2017 against Chile at the China Cup, that ended 1–1. His second and final international was against the hosts at that same tournament.

Career statistics

Club

International

References

External links
 

1992 births
Living people
Sportspeople from Osijek
Association football midfielders
Croatian footballers
Croatia youth international footballers
Croatia international footballers
NK Osijek players
Puskás Akadémia FC players
Újpest FC players
East Bengal Club players
Croatian Football League players
Nemzeti Bajnokság I players
Indian Super League players
Croatian expatriate footballers
Expatriate footballers in Hungary
Croatian expatriate sportspeople in Hungary
Expatriate footballers in the United Arab Emirates
Croatian expatriate sportspeople in the United Arab Emirates
Expatriate footballers in India
Croatian expatriate sportspeople in India